Carlisle is an unincorporated community in Noble County, in the U.S. state of Ohio.

History
Carlisle was laid out in 1838. The community once had a post office called Berne. The Berne post office closed in 1953.

References

Unincorporated communities in Noble County, Ohio
Unincorporated communities in Ohio